North Malaka is a locality (township) of Allahabad, Uttar Pradesh, India.

References 

Neighbourhoods in Allahabad